The woodland thicket rat (Grammomys dolichurus) is a species of rodent in the family Muridae.
It is found in Angola, Burundi, Democratic Republic of the Congo, Kenya, Malawi, Mozambique, Rwanda, South Africa, South Sudan, Eswatini, Tanzania, Zambia, and Zimbabwe.
Its natural habitats are subtropical or tropical dry forest, subtropical or tropical moist lowland forest, subtropical or tropical dry shrubland, subtropical or tropical moist shrubland, subtropical or tropical high-altitude shrubland, subtropical or tropical dry lowland grassland, arable land, pastureland, and urban areas.

References

 Taylor, P. & Boitani, L. 2004.  Grammomys dolichurus.   2006 IUCN Red List of Threatened Species.   Downloaded on 19 July 2007.

Grammomys
Rodents of Africa
Mammals described in 1832
Taxonomy articles created by Polbot